Nixonite is a mineral named after professor Peter H. Nixon (b. 1935). It is chemically related to freudenbergite and loparite-(Ce).

Bibliography

References 
Minerals